Cetonurichthys subinflatus, the smallpore whiptail, is a species of rattail found off western Australia.

References

External links
 Fishes of Australia : Cetonurichthys subinflatus

smallpore whiptail
Vertebrates of Western Australia
Marine fish of Western Australia
smallpore whiptail